The Afrikaans Wikipedia is an Afrikaans edition of the Web-based free-content encyclopedia Wikipedia. The project was started on 16 November 2001, and was the 11th Wikipedia to be created. In December 2016 it was the 84th largest Wikipedia by number of articles. Apart from South Africa and Namibia, the Afrikaans Wikipedia is used and maintained by users in Europe, North America and Oceania.

Visits and edits 
The Afrikaans Wikipedia makes up 0.008% of all Wikipedia searches. In the period of time between 1 July 2009 and 30 September 2013, the Afrikaans Wikipedia was visited the most by

 (64.0%)
 (5.5%)
 (4.1%)
  (26.4%)

The Afrikaans Wikipedia makes up 2.2% of all searches in South Africa, after the 92.7% of the English Wikipedia. In Namibia, the Afrikaans Wikipedia is used 1.2% of the time, after the English (85.3%), German (5.7%) and Portuguese (1.5%) Wikipedias.

0.1% of all German, 0.3% of all Belgian and 24.4% of all South African edits take place on the Afrikaans Wikipedia. Netherlands and Belgium's involvement in the Afrikaans Wikipedia is most likely due to the language relationship between Afrikaans and Dutch.

Milestones 
According to statistics, the following milestones were reached by the Afrikaans Wikipedia:

References

External links 

  Afrikaans Wikipedia
  Afrikaans Wikipedia mobile version (homepage not yet configured)
 Statistics for Afrikaans Wikipedia by Erik Zachte

Wikipedias by language
Wikipedias in Germanic languages
Wikipedia
Internet properties established in 2001
African encyclopedias